Cathal Pendred is an Irish actor and former mixed martial artist who competed in the Ultimate Fighting Championship. He was the Cage Warriors Welterweight World Champion.

Background
Pendred was born in Boston, Massachusetts to Irish immigrant parents, when he was four years old he moved to Dublin, Ireland with his parents where he was raised alongside a younger brother and two younger sisters. Pendred competed in rugby growing up and was talented, winning the Leinster Schools Senior Cup.

Mixed martial arts career

Early career
Pendred started his professional career in 2009. He became the number one ranked welterweight in Ireland during 2010 after winning the national title. In March 2013 he became the Cage Warriors Welterweight Champion after beating the title holder Gael Grimaud in London, England.

The Ultimate Fighter
Pendred was selected as a cast members of the nineteenth season of The Ultimate Fighter on 25 March 2014. He was then chosen as the third pick for the middleweights on coach  BJ Penn's team.

In the quarter-final rounds, Pendred fought Team Edgar middleweight Urbina. Pendred defeated Urbina by decision after three rounds. Pendred fought Eddie Gordon in the semi-finals. He lost the bout by a split decision.

Ultimate Fighting Championship

Pendred faced Team Penn teammate Mike King at middleweight on 19 July 2014 at UFC Fight Night 46. He was victorious via second round submission. The win earned him 'Fight of the Night' honours along with Mike King. However, King would also later go on to fail the drug test which resulted in his half of the bonus going to Pendred.

Pendred dropped to the welterweight division where he fought Gasan Umalatov on 4 October 2014 at UFC Fight Night: Nelson vs. Story. He defeated Umalatov by split decision.

Pendred next faced Sean Spencer on 18 January 2015 at UFC Fight Night 59. Pendred won the fight by a controversial unanimous decision. 
Both Joe Rogan and Mike Goldberg had felt Spencer had dominated the fight and declared on air how baffling the decision was; later UFC president Dana White echoed this sentiment on air.  Likewise, all 15 major MMA media outlets scored the fight in favour of Spencer.

Pendred faced Augusto Montaño on 13 June 2015 at UFC 188. He won the fight by unanimous decision. Montaño tested positive for testosterone metabolites in the post-fight drug test.

Pendred faced John Howard as a short notice replacement on 11 July 2015 at UFC 189. He lost the fight via split decision.

Pendred next faced Tom Breese on 24 October 2015 at UFC Fight Night 76. Pendred lost the fight by TKO in the first round.

Pendred announced his retirement from MMA on 25 November 2015.

Acting career
On 23 May 2017, it was announced that Pendred had been cast in a lead role in the Amazon produced TV series Lore, which is based on the popular podcast of the same name.
Pendred plays Michael Cleary, a real-life character from Irish folklore in the horror anthology series. Michael is married to the younger Bridget (played by Holland Roden). When Bridget starts making more money than he does, and starts questioning his decisions, Michael is convinced that his loving wife has been replaced by a changeling. Lore premiered on 13 October 2017.

Personal life
Pendred was educated in Belvedere College, Dublin and won a Leinster Senior Cup medal in 2005 alongside future Irish internationals Cian Healy and Ian Keatley.

Pendred attended Dublin City University where he studied forensics, he graduated with a BSc degree in Analytical Science in 2012.

In April 2014 Cathal was pictured carrying a baby dolphin into the ocean. The dolphin had become beached and was unable to return to deep enough water on its own. A picture was taken with the dolphin in Cathal's arms as he carried it into the sea, this picture went viral soon after the incident. Subsequently the story was reported across the globe.

In March 2022, Pendred graduated with a with a master’s degree in climate change from Dublin City University.

Other endeavors
Cathal was the subject of a 2013 MTV UK mini-documentary entitled "Pendred".

In 2015 Pendred became the first UFC fighter to support an anti-domestic violence group. He spearheaded a campaign which promoted the positive influence men can play in stopping domestic abuse of women and children. The campaign involved the release of a powerful YouTube video in which Pendred spoke about the role men can play in preventing abuse.

Filmography

Film

Television

Championships and accomplishments

Mixed martial arts
Ultimate Fighting Championship
Fight of the Night (One time) vs. Mike King
Cage Warriors Fighting Championship
CWFC Welterweight Championship (One time)
Cage Contender
Cage Contender Welterweight Championship (One time)

Mixed martial arts record

|-
|Loss
|align=center|17–4–1
|Tom Breese
|TKO (punches)
|UFC Fight Night: Holohan vs. Smolka
|
|align=center|1
|align=center|4:37
|Dublin, Ireland
|
|-
| Loss
| align=center| 17–3–1
| John Howard
| Decision (split)
| UFC 189 
| 
| align=center| 3
| align=center| 5:00
| Las Vegas, Nevada, United States
| 
|-
| Win
| align=center| 17–2–1
| Augusto Montaño
| Decision (unanimous)
| UFC 188
| 
| align=center| 3
| align=center| 5:00
| Mexico City, Mexico
| 
|-
| Win
| align=center| 16–2–1
| Sean Spencer
| Decision (unanimous)
| UFC Fight Night: McGregor vs. Siver
| 
| align=center| 3
| align=center| 5:00
| Boston, Massachusetts, United States
| 
|-
| Win
| align=center| 15–2–1
| Gasan Umalatov
| Decision (split) 
| UFC Fight Night: Nelson vs. Story
| 
| align=center| 3
| align=center| 5:00
| Stockholm, Sweden
| 
|-
| Win
| align=center| 14–2–1
| Mike King
| Technical Submission (rear-naked choke)
| UFC Fight Night: McGregor vs. Brandao
| 
| align=center| 2
| align=center| 3:33
| Dublin, Ireland
| 
|-
| Win
| align=center| 13–2–1
| Che Mills
| TKO (corner stoppage)
| CWFC 55
| 
| align=center| 3
| align=center| 1:47
| Dublin, Ireland
| 
|-
| Win
| align=center| 12–2–1
| Gael Grimaud
| Decision (unanimous)
| | Cage Warriors: 52
| 
| align=center| 5
| align=center| 5:00
| London, England
| 
|-
| Win
| align=center| 11–2–1
| Bruno Carvalho
| Decision (unanimous)
| Cage Warriors: 49
| 
| align=center| 3
| align=center| 5:00
| Cardiff, Wales
| 
|-
| Win
| align=center| 
| David Bielkheden
| Decision (unanimous) 
| Cage Warriors: 47
| 
| align=center| 3
| align=center| 5:00
| Dublin, Ireland
| 
|-
| Draw
| align=center| 9–2–1
| Danny Mitchell
| Draw
| Cage Warriors: Fight Night 2
| 
| align=center| 3
| align=center| 5:00
| Amman, Jordan
| 
|-
| Win
| align=center| 9–2
| Nico Musoke
| Decision (unanimous)
| OT: On Top 2
| 
| align=center| 2
| align=center| 5:00
| Glasgow, Scotland
| 
|-
| Win
| align=center| 8–2
| Vladimir Malko
| TKO (punches)
| Cage Warriors: 42
| 
| align=center| 2
| align=center| 3:14
| Cork City, Ireland
| 
|-
| Win
| align=center| 7–2
| Liam Shannon
| TKO (punches)
| Cage Contender 8
| 
| align=center| 3
| align=center| 2:03
| Dublin, Ireland
| 
|-
| Loss
| align=center| 6–2
| Lee Chadwick
| TKO (punches)
| OMMAC 8
| 
| align=center| 1
| align=center| 0:27
| Liverpool, England
| 
|-
| Win
| align=center| 6–1
| Jamie Rogers
| Decision (unanimous)
| Cage Warriors 39: The Uprising
| 
| align=center| 3
| align=center| 5:00
| Cork City, Ireland
| 
|-
| Win
| align=center| 5–1
| Yuri Malko
| TKO (punches)
| TNP: Boiling Points
| 
| align=center| 1
| align=center| 0:00
| Wexford, Ireland
| 
|-
| Win
| align=center| 4–1
| Liam Shannon
| Decision (unanimous)
| Cage Contender 5
| 
| align=center| 3
| align=center| 5:00
| Dublin, Ireland
| 
|-
| Win
| align=center| 3–1
| Jonny Shiels
| Decision (unanimous)
| Cage Contender 4
| 
| align=center| 3
| align=center| 5:00
| Belfast, Northern Ireland
| 
|-
| Win
| align=center| 2–1
| Merv Mulholland
| TKO (punches) 
| KO: The Fight Before Christmas 2
| 
| align=center| 2
| align=center| 4:02
| Dublin, Ireland
| 
|-
| Loss
| align=center| 1–1
| Ronan McKay
| Submission (triangle armbar) 
| Immortal Fighting Championship 1
| 
| align=center| 3
| align=center| 0:00
| Strabane, Northern Ireland
| 
|-
| Win
| align=center| 1–0
| Attila Horvarth
| TKO (punches)
| Strabane Fight Team: Fight Night 2
| 
| align=center| 1
| align=center| 0:38
| Strabane, Northern Ireland
|

Mixed martial arts exhibition record

|-
|Loss
|align=center|1–1
|Eddie Gordon
|Decision (split)
|The Ultimate Fighter: Team Edgar vs. Team Penn
| (airdate)
|align=center|3
|align=center|5:00
|Las Vegas, Nevada, United States
|
|-
|Win
|align=center|1–0
|Hector Urbina
|Decision (unanimous)
|The Ultimate Fighter: Team Edgar vs. Team Penn
| (airdate)
|align=center|3
|align=center|5:00
|Las Vegas, Nevada, United States
|
|-

See also
 List of Irish UFC fighters
 List of current UFC fighters
 List of male mixed martial artists

References

External links
 
 

1987 births
Sportspeople from Boston
Living people
American emigrants to Ireland
Irish male mixed martial artists
Middleweight mixed martial artists
Welterweight mixed martial artists
Mixed martial artists utilizing Brazilian jiu-jitsu
Irish practitioners of Brazilian jiu-jitsu
American people of Irish descent
People educated at Belvedere College
Ultimate Fighting Championship male fighters